Sant Ram Udasi (20 April 1939 – 6 November 1986) was one of the major Punjabi poets emerging out of the Naxalite movement  in the Indian Punjab towards the late 1960s, writing about revolutionary and Dalit consciousness. Lok Kavi Sant Ram Udasi Memorial Trust (International) was established as a research foundation focusing on the life and works of Sant Ram Udasi.

During the 1970s he wrote three collections of poetry:
Lahu Bhije Bol (Blood-soaked Words)
Saintan (Gestures)
Chounukrian (the Four-edged)

References

Punjabi-language poets
1939 births
1986 deaths
Naxalite–Maoist insurgency
Dalit leaders
Activists from Punjab, India
Poets from Punjab, India
20th-century Indian poets
People from Sangrur district